Marathon Enterprises, Inc., is a major regional supplier of meats and gourmet delicatessen products to the food service industry in the New York City metropolitan area. Headquartered in Englewood, New Jersey, it is a private corporation, and sells its products under the Sabrett brand name.

History
Samuel Ogus (1891-1970), who emigrated from Latvia in 1909, started the wholesale bakery, the Star Baking Company, later to become Sabrett Food Products, in 1928 with a partner, Fritz Frankel.  Mr. Ogus was what they used to call the "inside" man - running the factory and even designing much of the equipment, and Mr. Frankel was the "outside" man, dealing directly with the sales force and the customers.  A few years later in the 1930s, the two men realized there was an increasing demand for hot dog rolls - their slogan was "largest hot dog roll manufacturer in the world!"  - and they decided to manufacture hot dogs as well.   They planned to call the combined company Star but the meat company Armour/Star objected, so they chose Sabre with the slogan "keen on quality.”  They couldn't use that name either, because there was a Sabre tuna fish company.  So they decided on Sabrett, a little saber, "small and sharp." The company was located on the lower East Side, on East 3rd Street.  During the Great Depression, hotdogs were particularly popular because you could get a meal for twenty-five cents.  Sabrett moved the bakery and then the hotdog factory to Jersey City in the late forties.

Sabrett was known for spicy, all-beef casing kosher-style hotdogs. The ubiquitous hotdog carts were bought exclusively from Sabrett's but were independently owned.  Sometimes one owner had several carts.  Major Sabrett customers also included Nathan's Famous in Coney Island, Papaya King, and the Stevens Company, who supplied hotdogs to all the ballparks. Eventually, Sabrett expanded to supermarkets and went national.

Mr. Frankel had a daughter, Pearl, and a son, Jules.  Pearl married Kurt Teitler and both Kurt and Jules Frankel joined Sabrett.  Mr. Ogus had one daughter, Marilyn, who married Maurice B. "Mac"  Katz (1927-1990).  Mac Katz joined the business in 1958 and ran it with Mr. Ogus, Kurt Teitler and Jules Frankel.  After Fritz Frankel and Jules Frankel died, Pearl and Kurt's two daughters, Ellen and Cherri, had married, and their husbands, Eric Merlin and Boyd Adelman entered the business in the 1960s.  For over thirty years, Sabrett was run by the son-in-law (Mac) and the grandsons-in-law, (Eric and Boyd) of the two original founders.   Hans Mueller, a German immigrant, was a sausage maker at Sabrett from 1956-1994, and the 'working foreman' from the mid-1970s until 1994.  When Sabrett was sold to Gregory Papalexsis of Marathon Industries in 1989, only Boyd Adelman remained in management.  Marathon bought rights to retain the Sabrett name which is synonymous with hotdogs in New York City.

Products

Frankfurters
The company's flagship product is the Sabrett brand frankfurter. They and other meats, such as pastrami and salami, are processed at the Marathon factory in the Bronx, New York. The frankfurters are sold through Sabrett branded carts on the streets of New York City and elsewhere in the metropolitan area, local supermarkets, and club locations such as BJ's, Costco, and Jetro.

Condiments
Other products sold under the Sabrett brand name include condiments popular on hot dogs, such as sauerkraut, sweet relish, spicy brown mustard, and a tomato-based onion sauce known as "Sabrett Onions in Sauce."

See also 

 Alan Geisler
 Catering
 Concession stand
 Fast food
 Food booth
Food cart
Food street
 Hot dog
 Hot dog stand
 List of street food
 List of snack foods
 Snack food
 Street market

References

External links
Sabrett Hot Dogs

Companies based in Bergen County, New Jersey
Englewood, New Jersey
Meat companies of the United States
Brand name hot dogs
Hot dog restaurants in the United States
Street food
Sausage companies of the United States
Condiment companies of the United States